RockNess 2011 was the sixth RockNess Festival to take place. It took place on 10–12 June 2011. On 12 October 2010, it was announced that a limited number of early bird tickets, priced at £99 including camping, would be sold from 28 October. All 3000 tickets were sold on the morning of the launch, causing organisers to bring forward a second early bird offer of £135, including weekend camping and bus travel from a number of cities across the United Kingdom. Student and payment plan tickets were also made available.

On 24 November 2010, the festival's first headline act was announced as The Chemical Brothers. Confirmed to headline the Saturday of the festival, organisers revealed the act through the festival's Twitter account. Friday night headliners Kasabian and Sunday night headliner Paolo Nutini were revealed on 25 November and 26 November, respectively, with full priced weekend camping tickets also going on sale.

25 additions were made to the line-up on 24 February 2011, with organiser Jim King revealing that the festival had sold ten times as many tickets as the same point from the previous year. Further announcements took place between March and May. Two new arenas were announced for the 2011 event, including the Sub Club Sound System, and the Rock N Roll Circus. On 19 May 2011, festival organisers announced the Official RockNess Guide. The guide including important festival information, ones to watch lists and stage splits.

Line-up

 Still to be announced is the Sound City Stage, a new stage at the festival in partnership with Liverpool Sound City, featuring a further twenty artists and DJs selected through a talent competition. The festival will also feature a comedy tent, headlined by Ian Cognito, Sean Hughes and Daniel Sloss alongside other comedians.

Notes

RockNess
2011 music festivals
June 2011 events in the United Kingdom
2011 in Scotland
2011 in British music